Aliabad-e Nazarali Khan (also Romanized as ‘Alīābād-e Naz̧ar‘alī Khān; also known as ‘Alīābād-e Naz̧arkhānī) is a village in Jafarabad Rural District, Jafarabad District, Qom County, Qom Province, Iran. At the 2006 census, its population was 155, in 33 families.

References 

Populated places in Qom Province